Brad Wood is an American record producer located in Los Angeles. He has produced many albums, including Liz Phair's Exile in Guyville and Placebo's debut.

Career
Wood is from Rockford, Illinois, United States. 
In 1988, Wood, along with Brian Deck and Daniel Sonis built Idful Music Corporation recording studio in Chicago's Wicker Park. While at Idful he recorded and produced hundreds of records, including Liz Phair's Exile in Guyville, Veruca Salt's American Thighs, Ben Lee's Grandpa Would, Sunny Day Real Estate's Diary and LP2, and albums by Red Red Meat, Seam, That Dog, and others. In addition to producing records, Brad was the drummer/soprano saxophonist for Shrimp Boat and touring drummer for Liz Phair (1993–94).

After relocating to Los Angeles, California, Wood has continued to record, mix, and produce records, primarily from his Seagrass Studio in Valley Village. He has worked on recordings by mewithoutYou, Touché Amoré, Skating Polly, Say Anything, Pete Yorn, and Dar Williams.

Records produced or mixed

References

External links
official website
discography from discogs.com
album credits from allmusic.com
Brad Wood interview from Tape Op Magazine
Edgy In Chicago 1994 from New York Times

Record producers from Illinois
Musicians from Rockford, Illinois
American rock drummers
Living people
1964 births